Mée is a commune in the Mayenne department in north-western France.

History
Under the Ancien Régime, the town was part of the stronghold of the Angevin barony of Craon, depended on the main senechaussee of Angers and the chosen country of Château-Gontier.

In 1635 was listed on the territory of the municipality a rather mediocre fund, containing 350 arpents in arable land, 165 in pasture, 85 in meadows, 216 in wood, 8 in farms and 214 in "heaths and ungrateful lands."

The main resource of the town was for a long time only the chestnut trees. There were 54 farms in Méé in 1853.

See also
Communes of Mayenne

References

Communes of Mayenne